Carlo Armellini (1777 – 6 June 1863) was a Roman politician, activist and jurist. 
He was part of the triumvirate leading the short-lived Roman Republic in 1849, together with Giuseppe Mazzini and Aurelio Saffi.

Armellini was born in Rome, then part of the Papal States. A moderate in politics, he followed with interest the apparently progressist moves of the first part of the pontificate of Pius IX. During Anti-Catholic protests in 1848, Armellini saved the Santo Bambino of Aracoeli from arson.

After the assassination of Pellegrino Rossi and the exile of the Pope, he became Minister of the Interior. He organized the Constituent assembly and, when the Roman Republic was declared, became (March 1849) one of three member of the leading triumvirate with Giuseppe Mazzini and Aurelio Saffi. He collaborated with Antonio Saliceti in the writing of the Constitution.

When the Republic was smashed by the French army, he went in exile to Belgium. He died there, in Saint-Josse-ten-Noode, in 1863.

Armellini was married to the pastellist Faustina Bracci Armellini.

References

Sources
Claudio Rendina, Enciclopedia di Roma. Newton Compton, Rome. 1999.

See also
Roman Republic
Unification of Italy
Giuseppe Mazzini
Pius IX

People of the Revolutions of 1848
Italian jurists
Politicians from Rome
1777 births
1863 deaths
Italian independence activists
19th-century Italian jurists